Metompkin  Island is a barrier island off the east coast of Virginia in the United States. It is located in Accomack County.

A proposed United States Navy seaplane tender, USS Metomkin (AVP-47), was to have been named for Metomkin Island, but the ship was cancelled in 1943 before construction could begin. However, a U.S. Navy cargo ship, USS Metomkin (AG-136), in commission from 1947 to 1951, did carry the island's name.

References
 (See ship namesake paragraph.)

Islands of Accomack County, Virginia
Barrier islands of Virginia